VRV (officially pronounced "verve", though it is also referred to by its letters) is an over-the-top streaming service launched in November 2016. Owned by Crunchyroll, run by Sony through a joint venture between Sony Pictures and Sony Music Entertainment Japan's Aniplex, the service bundles together anime, speculative fiction and gaming related channels and the service targets these large fandoms.

Some of VRV's content can be streamed for free, while other content requires a subscription. The subscriptions to its channels can be purchased individually, or in a premium bundle. VRV is available only in the United States, despite some of its partnered content being available for viewing worldwide outside the platform.

History
Ellation, owners of Crunchyroll, formally announced the launch of VRV on June 14, 2016. Its initial partners included Rooster Teeth, Seeso, Nerdist, Geek & Sundry, and Frederator's Cartoon Hangover.

On September 29, 2016, Funimation, Adam Savage's Tested, RiffTrax, CollegeHumor, Machinima.com, Ginx TV, Shudder, and Mondo Media were announced as new partners. VRV would officially launch on November 14, 2016.

On August 9, 2017, the VRV Select channel was launched, featuring content from other sources. It was also announced that Machinima, Ginx, and Rifftrax were being dropped from the service. On the same day as VRV Select's announcement, Seeso announced via its Facebook page that it would be shutting down by the end of 2017. Though RiffTrax, Machinima and Seeso's channels were dropped, some of their content, including Seeso's The Cyanide & Happiness Show, HarmonQuest, Hidden America with Jonah Ray, and My Brother, My Brother and Me would migrate to VRV Select.

On November 21, 2017, CuriosityStream and Mubi joined VRV.

On December 12, 2017, DramaFever joined VRV.

On May 3, 2018, it was announced that Tested was being dropped, with its content moving to VRV Select.

On August 28, 2018, VRV launched NickSplat, named after the TeenNick programming block, featuring classic Nickelodeon series from the 1990s and early 2000s.

On October 12, 2018, Shout! Factory's content, such as Mystery Science Theater 3000 and ReBoot, were made available to watch on VRV Select.

On October 18, 2018, Funimation announced that they would be leaving VRV, as their partnership with Crunchyroll ended, and all of their titles would disappear on November 9, 2018. On that same day, VRV announced that HIDIVE would be joining the service to replace Funimation.

On November 1, 2018, HIDIVE was launched on VRV and it was announced that Boomerang would be joining the service on November 13, 2018.

On November 7, 2018, Season 1 of TBS' Final Space was made available to watch on VRV Select

On November 8, 2018, Otter Media announced Mike Tyson Mysteries and Jabberjaw as upcoming programs for VRV that were going to be added in 2018. However, both series never actually came to the service. Mike Tyson Mysteries was eventually added to Hulu in 2020 and Tubi in 2022, while Jabberjaw has yet to appear on a streaming service.

On August 9, 2021, Crunchyroll was acquired by Sony-owned Funimation, making Sony the new owner of VRV.

On September 8, 2021, HIDIVE announced that it would be leaving VRV on September 30, 2021.

On November 18, 2021, it was announced via email to subscribers that Rooster Teeth would be leaving VRV on December 13, 2021. Cartoon Hangover was also removed at the same time.

As of February 2022, the only remaining channels are Crunchyroll, Mondo, and VRV Select.

On March 1, 2022, it was announced that VRV would be merged into Crunchyroll itself, alongside Funimation and Wakanim.

Channels

Current
 Crunchyroll—Anime and simulcasts
 Mondo Media—Adult animation
 VRV Select—A curated selection of movies and shows for premium subscribers

Former
 Boomerang–Cartoons from Warner Bros. (left December 1, 2020)
 Cartoon Hangover—Web-original cartoons from Frederator Studios (left December 13, 2021)
 CuriosityStream—Non-fiction documentaries relating to science, technology, nature, and world history (left November 19, 2019)
 DramaFever—Korean dramas (shut down on October 16, 2018, subsequently left VRV days after)
 Funimation—Japanese anime dubbed into English (left November 9, 2018)
 Geek & Sundry—Geek culture and lifestyle programming (left April 1, 2019)
 Ginx TV—Esports-related content
 HIDIVE—Dubbed and subtitled anime (left September 30, 2021)
 Machinima—gaming-related content (some content is still available via VRV Select, the rest will be available through Rooster Teeth soon)
 Mubi—Curates classic and arthouse films (left October 2018)
 Nerdist—Fandom-related news, podcasts, and comedy programming (left April 1, 2019)
 NickRewind—Television series from Nickelodeon that aired in the 1990s and early 2000s (left August 29, 2020)
 RiffTrax—MST3K-style movie commentaries (some content is still available via VRV Select)
 Rooster Teeth—Web animation and gaming-related content (left December 13, 2021)
 Seeso—original and licensed comedy programming (shut down on November 8, 2017, some original programming were migrated to VRV Select)
 Shudder—Horror films (left August 1, 2019)
 Tested (left May 3, 2018, some content is still available via VRV Select)

Original programming

Series

Continuations

Availability 
VRV can be accessed through its website, as well as apps for iOS (on iPhone and iPad), Android, Android TV, tvOS on Apple TV (on 4th generation and 4K), Chromecast, Fire TV, Fire HD, newer Roku streaming devices, Xbox One, and Xbox Series X/S.

Notes

See also
 ZEE5
 SonyLIV
 Crunchyroll
 Wakanim
 Anime on Demand
 Hooq
 Hulu
 DramaFever
 FilmStruck
 DC Universe
 HBO Max
 Vudu
 List of streaming media services

References

External links 
 

American companies established in 2016
American companies disestablished in 2022
Crunchyroll
Streaming television in the United States
Internet television streaming services
Video game culture
Defunct video on demand services
Defunct subscription services
Subscription video on demand services
Companies based in San Francisco
Mass media companies established in 2016
Mass media companies disestablished in 2022
Internet properties established in 2016
Internet properties disestablished in 2022
PlayStation 4 software
2018 mergers and acquisitions
2021 mergers and acquisitions
Former Sony subsidiaries
Former AT&T subsidiaries